Mednogorsky is an urban locality (a work settlement) in Urupsky District of the Karachay-Cherkess Republic, Russia. As of the 2010 Census, its population was 5,960.

History
It was established in 1961 and granted urban-type settlement status in 1981.

Administrative and municipal status
Within the framework of administrative divisions, the work settlement of Mednogorsky is subordinated to Urupsky District. As a municipal division, Mednogorsky is incorporated within Urupsky Municipal District as Mednogorskoye Urban Settlement.

References

Notes

Sources

Urban-type settlements in the Karachay-Cherkess Republic